Rangoon, or Yangon, is the former capital city of Burma.

Rangoon may also refer to:

 Yangon River, also known as the Rangoon River, which flows through the city of Yangon
 Rangoon (2017 Tamil film), an Indian Tamil-language film
 Rangoon (2017 Hindi film), an Indian Hindi-language film
 Crab Rangoon, a type of dumpling found in American Chinese cuisine
 Short Rangoon, a British flying-boat of the 1930s